The Field Artillery Branch is a combat arms branch of the United States Army that is responsible for field artillery.

Historical background
The U.S. Army Field Artillery branch traces its origins to 17 November 1775 when the Continental Congress, unanimously elected Henry Knox "Colonel of the Regiment of Artillery". The regiment formally entered service on 1 January 1776.  During the 19th Century a total of seven Artillery regiments were formed which contained a mixture of "heavy" artillery companies and "light" artillery batteries.  The light artillery batteries took the role of field artillery although they did not use that designation. The seven artillery regiments were designated as regiments of artillery and were not distinguished as being either "coast" or "field" artillery as was the practice in the 20th Century.

In the reorganization of the Army by the Act of 2 February 1901, the seven Artillery regiments were reorganized as the Artillery Corps.  The Corps was split into 195 battery-sized units, called companies at the time, of Field Artillery and Coast Artillery. In 1907 the Artillery Corps was reorganized into the Field Artillery and the Coast Artillery Corps. Although presently Field Artillery and Air Defense Artillery are separate branches, both inherit the traditions of the Artillery branch.

In 1907, the Field Artillery companies of the Artillery Corps were organized into six Field Artillery regiments.  In 1916, as the United States was preparing for its eventual entry into World War I, these six regiments were supplemented by 15 more Field Artillery regiments.  During World War I numerous other Field Artillery Regiments were organized in the National Guard and National Army, which were mobilized to supplement the Regular Army.

Lineage
In 1924 the Army organized the Coast Artillery Corps into regiments. The first seven regiments retained the lineage of the seven Artillery regiments which existed in the 19th Century.  The Coast Artillery Corps was disbanded in 1950 and its units were consolidated with the Field Artillery in the Artillery branch.  In 1968 the Artillery branch divided into Field Artillery and Air Defense Artillery branches with the newly formed 1st through 7th Air Defense Artillery regiments retaining the lineage of the seven 19th Century artillery regiments.

Although the oldest Artillery regiments in the Army are in the Air Defense Artillery branch, this is not necessarily the case for individual units below the regimental level.  For example, the 1st Battalion of the 5th Field Artillery traces its lineage to the Alexander Hamilton Battery, formed in 1776, which is the oldest Artillery unit in the active United States Army and is the only Regular Army unit which can trace its lineage to the American Revolution.

The oldest Field Artillery unit in the U.S. Army is 1st Battalion, 101st Field Artillery, Massachusetts Army National Guard, which traces its origins to December 1636.  Originally an Infantry unit, it was reorganized as an Artillery unit in 1916.

Mission statement 
The mission of the Field Artillery is to destroy, defeat, or disrupt the enemy with integrated fires to enable maneuver commanders to dominate in unified land operations.

History 
The Field Artillery is one of the Army's combat arms, traditionally one of the three major branches (with Infantry and Armor). It refers to those units that use artillery weapons systems to deliver surface-to-surface long range indirect fire. Indirect fire means that the projectile does not follow the line of sight to the target. Mortars are not field artillery weapons; they are organic to infantry units and are manned by infantry personnel (US Army MOS 11C or USMC 0341).

The term field artillery is to distinguish from the Air Defense Artillery, and historically, from the U.S. Army Coast Artillery Corps (with the function of coastal defense artillery), a branch which existed from 1901–1950. In 1950, the two branches were unified and called simply Artillery, until Air Defense Artillery was made into a separate branch in 1968. The insignia of the Field Artillery branch is a pair of crossed field guns (19th-century-style cannon) in gold, and dates back to 1834.

The home of the Field Artillery and the Field Artillery School are at Fort Sill, Oklahoma.

Field artillery is called the "King of Battle". Conflicts in the 20th century saw artillery become exponentially more effective as indirect fire methods were introduced immediately prior to World War I. During World War I and World War II, field artillery was the single highest casualty-producing weapons system on any battlefield.

Soldiers from artillery units have often been used as infantry during both the Iraq War and the War in Afghanistan.  While field artillery units have often performed admirably as infantry and accomplishing infantry missions, such use has led to atrophy of essential field artillery specific skills and tasks.

Branch colors
Members of the Field Artillery are referred to as "redlegs" because during the Mexican American War, both Ringgold's Battery and Duncan's Battery were issued uniforms distinguished by scarlet stripes down the legs of their uniform pants, a practice continued through the Civil War and on dress uniforms even after WWI.

Scarlet was established as the Artillery Branch color along with crossed cannon branch insignia in the Regulations of 1833. Branch colors are found on the shoulder straps of officers wearing the blue dress uniform and on branch of service scarves authorized for wear with a variety of uniforms.

Chief of Field Artillery
From 1903 to 1908, one Chief of Artillery oversaw both field artillery and coast artillery. The Chiefs of Artillery from this time were:

Brigadier General Wallace F. Randolph, 1903–1904
Brigadier General John Patten Story, 1904–1905
Brigadier General Samuel M. Mills, 1905–1906
Brigadier General Arthur Murray, 1906–1908 (became the first Chief of Coast Artillery)

After 1908, one general served as Chief of Coast Artillery which had a corps structure, while the Field Artillery had a regimental structure and had no chief or corps designation.

This disorganized Field Artillery occasioned a boardroom bloodletting in December 1917 after the entry of the US into the First World War in April 1917 proved that the Quartermaster General of the United States Army Henry Granville Sharpe was unfit for this purpose. In the aftermath of bloody Tuesday Brigadier general William J. Snow was appointed to the unofficial post of Chief of Field Artillery in February 1918. He continued in that post after it was codified into law in 1920. He served until retiring in 1927, and oversaw the artillery branch's postwar reorganization, including the beginning of testing and experimentation to determine how to transition from horse drawn equipment to mechanized, and modernize processes for directing and controlling indirect fire to improve speed and accuracy.

After 1920, the Chief of Coast Artillery was joined by the Chief of Field Artillery. From 1920 to 1942, the Field Artillery corps was led by a branch chief who held the rank of major general. This was in keeping with the Army's other major branches, including infantry, cavalry, and coast artillery.  Each chief was responsible for planning and overseeing execution of training, equipping, and manning within his branch. 

The branch chief positions were eliminated in 1942, and their functions consolidated under the commander of the Army Ground Forces as a way to end inter-branch rivalries and enable synchronized and coordinated activities as part of World War II's combined arms doctrine. The Chiefs of Field Artillery from this time were:
Major General William J. Snow, 1920–1927
Major General Fred T. Austin, 1927–1930
Major General Harry G. Bishop, 1930–1934
Major General Upton Birnie Jr., 1934–1938
Major General Robert M. Danford, 1938–1942

Publications
The professional journal of the Field Artillery is published at Fort Sill. Known as the Field Artillery Journal in 1911, it went through many name changes through Field Artillery in 1987. The journal merged with Air Defense Artillery in 2007 to become Fires.

Current weapon systems
The U.S. Army employs five types of field artillery weapon systems:
 M119A3 105mm light towed howitzer
 M777A2 155mm medium towed howitzer
 M109A7 Paladin 155mm self-propelled howitzer
 M142 High Mobility Rocket Artillery System (HIMARS), a wheeled launcher capable of firing 227mm rockets or Army Tactical Missile System (ATACMS) missiles
 M270A1 Multiple Launch Rocket System (MLRS), a self-propelled launcher capable of firing 227mm rockets or Army Tactical Missile System (ATACMS) missiles.

Long Range Precision Fires 
Long Range Precision Fires (LRPF) is a priority of the U.S. Army Futures Command (AFC). The aim is to modernize a suite of capabilities of the artillery.     LRPF appears to be a
project of an AFC Cross-functional team (CFT), a 
requirements definition process for new capabilities, such as targeting the new thousand-mile missiles,  "streamlining the sensor-shooter link at every echelon"—Col (Promotable) John Rafferty, for a
 Strategic Long Range Cannon (SLRC) for a hypersonic projectile (program cancelled in May 2022), a
target capability for the Field Artillery (its howitzers) and Air Defense Artillery (a 500 km missile), and a
test case for the acquisition process of the U.S. Army such as the Long-Range Hypersonic Weapon (LRHW), a standoff weapon to be fielded by FY2023. The LRHW has been named Dark Eagle by the US Army.

Future Weapon Systems

Long Range Precision Fires (LRPF) CFT 

According to AFC, the mission of the Long Range Precision Fires (LRPF) CFT is to "deliver cutting-edge surface-to-surface (SSM) fires systems that will significantly increase range and effects over currently fielded US and adversary systems."

AFC's five major programs for LRPF are:

 The Extended Range Cannon Artillery (ERCA) program which develops a system capable of firing accurately at targets beyond 70 km as opposed to the M109A7's 30 km current range
 The Precision Strike Mission (PrSM) which is a precision-strike guided SSM fired from the M270A1 MLRS and M142 HIMARS doubling the present rate-of-fire with two missiles per launch pod
 The Strategic Long-Range Cannon (SLRC) program, which would have developed a system that could have fired a hypersonic projectile up to 1,000 miles against air defense, artillery, missile systems, and command and control targets was terminated 23 May 2022.
 The Common-Hypersonic Glide Body (C-HGB) is a collaborative program between the Army, Navy, Air Force, and Missile Defense Agency (MDA) which is planned to become the base of the Long-Range Hypersonic Weapon (LRHW) program
 A ground-launchable UGM-109 Tomahawk Land Attack Missile, as well as the SM-6 (RIM-174 Standard ERAM) to fill the gap in the Army's mid-range missile capabilities.

Based on Futures Command's development between July 2018 and December 2020, by 2023 the earliest versions of these weapons will be fielded:

The kill chains will take less than 1 minute, from detection of the target, to execution of the fires command; these operations will have the capability to precisely strike "command centers, air defenses, missile batteries, and logistics centers" nearly simultaneously.
 The speed of battle damage assessment will depend on the travel time of the munition. This capability depends on the ability of a specialized CFT, Assured precision navigation and timing (APNT) to provide detail.
 Precision Strike Missiles (PrSMs) can reach in excess of 150 miles, with current 2020 tests
 Mid-range capability (MRC) fires can reach in excess of 500 to 1000 miles, using mature Navy missiles
 Long-Range Hypersonic Weapons (LRHWs) are to have a range greater than 1725 miles.

The current M109A6 "Paladin" howitzer range is doubled in the M109A7 variant. An operational test of components of the Long range cannon was scheduled for 2020. The LRC is complementary to Extended range cannon artillery (ERCA), the M1299 Extended Range Cannon Artillery howitzer. Baseline ERCA is to enter service in 2023.  Investigations for ERCA in 2025: rocket-boosted artillery shells:  Tests of the Multiple launch rocket system (MLRS) XM30 rocket shell have demonstrated a near-doubling of the range of the munition, using the Tail controlled guided multiple launch rocket system, or TC-G. The TRADOC capability manager (TCM) Field Artillery Brigade - DIVARTY has been named a command position.
An autoloader for ERCA's 95-pound shells is under development at Picatinny Arsenal, to support a sustained firing rate of 10 rounds a minute  A robotic vehicle for carrying the shells is a separate effort at Futures Command's Army Applications Lab.
 The Precision Strike Missile (PrSM) is intended to replace the Army Tactical Missile System (MGM-140 ATACMS) in 2023. PrSM flight testing is delayed beyond 2 August 2019, the anticipated date for the expiration of the Intermediate-range Nuclear Forces Treaty, which set 499 kilometer limits on intermediate-range missiles. (David Sanger and Edward Wong projected that the earliest test of a longer range missile could be a ground-launched version of a Tomahawk cruise missile, followed by a test of a mobile ground launched IRBM with a range of 1800–2500 miles before year-end 2019.) The 2020 National Defense Authorization Act (NDAA) was approved on 9 December 2019, which allowed the Pentagon to continue testing such missiles in FY2020. The Lockheed PrSM prototype had its first launch on 10 December 2019 at White Sands Missile Range, in a 150-mile test, and an overhead detonation; the Raytheon PrSM prototype was delayed from its planned November launch, and Raytheon has now withdrawn from the PrSM risk reduction phase. The PrSM's range and accuracy, the interfaces to HIMARS launcher, and test software, met expectations. PrSM passed Milestone B on 1 October 2021. Baseline PrSM is to enter service in 2023; an upgraded version of PrSM, with multi-mode seekers will then be sought.
 For targets beyond the PrSM's range, the Army's RCCTO will seek a mid-range missile prototype by 2023, with a reach from 1000 to 2000 miles. Loren Thompson points out that a spectrum of medium-range to long-range weapons will be available to the service by 2023; RCCTO's prototype Mid-Range Capability (MRC) battery will field mature Navy missiles, likely for the Indo-Pacific theater in FY2023. DARPA is developing OpFires, an intermediate-range hypersonic weapon which is shorter-range than the Army's LRHW. DARPA is seeking a role in the armory for OpFires' throttle-able rocket motor, post-2023. DARPA announced in July 2022 it successfully tested its OpFires hypersonic weapon at White Sands Missile Range (WSMR) for the first time. The OpFires launch was from a Marine Corps logistics truck. OpFires will "rapidly and precisely engage critical, time-sensitive targets while penetrating modern enemy air defenses", potentially to be launched from a High Mobility Artillery Rocket System (HIMARS) launcher.  These weapons will likely require planning for new Army (or Joint) formations. 
 The Long range hypersonic weapons (LRHWs) will use precision targeting data against anti-access area denial (A2AD) radars and other critical infrastructure of near-peer competitors by 2023.  LRHW does depend on stable funding.
Advanced Field Artillery Tactical Data System (AFATDS) 7.0 is the vehicle for a Multi-domain task force's artillery battery very similar to a THAAD battery: beginning in 2020, these batteries will train for a hypersonic glide vehicle which is common to the Joint forces. The Long range hypersonic weapon (LRHW) glide vehicle is to be launched from transporter erector launchers. Tests of the Common hypersonic glide body (C-HGB) to be used by the Army and Navy were meeting expectations in 2020. 
In August 2020 the director of Assured precision navigation and timing (APNT) CFT announced tests which integrate the entire fires kill chain, from initial detection to final destruction. William B. Nelson announced the flow of satellite data from the European theater (Germany), and AI processing of AFATDS targeting data to the fires units.
In September 2020 an AI kill chain was formulated in seconds; a hypervelocity (speeds up to Mach 5) munition, launched from a descendant of the Paladin, intercepted a cruise missile surrogate.
Three flight tests of LRHW were scheduled in 2021; that plan was changed to one test in late 2021, followed by a multi-missile test in 2022.
The LRHW has been named 'Dark Eagle' The first LRHW battery will start to receive its first operational rounds in early FY2023; all eight rounds for this battery will have been delivered by FY2023. By then, the PEO Missiles and Space will have picked up the LRHW program, for batteries two and three in FY'25 and FY'27, respectively. Battery one will first train, and then participate in the LRHW flight test launches in FY'22 and FY'23.

Organization
In 1789 after the Revolution there was only one battalion of four companies of artillery.  In 1794 a "Corps of Artillerists and Engineers" was organized, which included the four companies of artillery then in service and had sixteen companies in four battalions.  In 1802 there was a reduction of the army. The Artillery were separated from the Engineers and the former formed into one regiment of 20 companies.  In 1808 a regiment of ten companies called the "Regiment of Light Artillery" was formed.  In 1812 two more regiments were added.

In 1821 four regiments were created from existing units on the following lines.
 1st Regiment of Artillery, 2 March 1821, listed by artillery battery:
A
B
C
D
E
F
G
H
I
K- added 1832
L- added 1847
M- added 1847
N- added 1899
O- added 1899
 2nd Regiment of Artillery, 2 March 1821
 Battery A, 2nd U.S. Artillery
 3rd Regiment of Artillery, 2 March 1821
 4th Regiment of Artillery, 2 March 1821
 4th U.S. Artillery, Battery H
 4th U.S. Artillery, Battery I
 4th U.S. Artillery, Battery M
 5th Regiment of Artillery, 4 May 1861
 5th U.S. Artillery, Battery H
 6th Regiment of Artillery, 8 March 1898
 7th Regiment of Artillery, 8 March 1898
(98 Batteries)
In 1901 the regimental organization of the US Army artillery was abolished, more companies were added, and given numerical designations.
 126 companies of heavy (coast) artillery 
 30 companies of light (field) artillery 
In 1907 the Coast Artillery Corps was established as a separate branch, and the Field Artillery re-established regiments officially, although provisional regiments had existed since 1905.
 1st Field Artillery Regiment
 With 2 battalions each with 3 batteries
 2nd Field Artillery Regiment
 3rd Field Artillery Regiment
 4th Field Artillery Regiment
 5th Field Artillery Regiment
 6th Field Artillery Regiment
In 1916 Congress enacted the National Defense Act and 15 more regiments were authorized.
 7th Field Artillery Regiment
 8th Field Artillery Regiment
 9th Field Artillery Regiment
 10th Field Artillery Regiment
 11th Field Artillery Regiment
 12th Field Artillery Regiment
 13th Field Artillery Regiment
 14th Field Artillery Regiment
 15th Field Artillery Regiment
 16th Field Artillery Regiment
 17th Field Artillery Regiment
 18th Field Artillery Regiment
 19th Field Artillery Regiment
 20th Field Artillery Regiment
 21st Field Artillery Regiment

In 1917, following the American entry into World War I, the numbers from 1 through 100 were reserved for the Regular Army, from 101 through 300 for the National Guard, and 301 and above for the National Army. Under this system the 1st through 21st and 76th through 83d were organized in the Regular Army; the 101st through 151st, in the National Guard; and, the 25th through 75th, 84th and 85th, and the 301st through 351st in the National Army. Field Artillery Brigades, numbered 1st through 24th, 51st through 67th, and 151st through 172d, were also organized, with each brigade typically commanding three regiments; each division had one of these artillery brigades.

A 1918 expansion added the 22d Field Artillery Regiment through the 39th Field Artillery Regiment
with some exceptions, notably Philippine Scouts units.

The Coast Artillery Corps constantly reorganized the numbered companies until 1924, but during World War I created 61 artillery regiments from the numbered companies, for service (or potential service) with the American Expeditionary Forces (AEF); the 30th through 45th Artillery Brigades were also created to command groups of these regiments. These regiments operated almost all US-manned heavy and railway artillery on the Western Front, and were designated, for example, 51st Artillery (Coast Artillery Corps (CAC)). Most of these were disbanded immediately after the war. The Coast Artillery also acquired the antiaircraft mission during the war, which was formalized a few years later. In 1924 the Coast Artillery Corps adopted a regimental system, and numbered companies were returned to letter designations. (In order to promote esprit-de-corps, the first 7 regiments were linked to the original 7 regiments of artillery). During 1943 most antiaircraft units lost their Coast Artillery designations, and the regiments were broken up into battalions. However, the antiaircraft branch remained nominally part of the Coast Artillery Corps. In late 1944 the Coast Artillery harbor defense regiments were inactivated or reorganized as battalions, which themselves were mostly disbanded in April 1945, with personnel transferred to the local Harbor Defense Commands. 977 Coast Artillery and antiaircraft battalions were created before the branch's demise in 1950.

In 1943 an Army-wide (except infantry) reorganization created numerous serially numbered battalions, and most regiments were broken up into battalions. Also during World War II new designations were applied to some units, the "Armored Field Artillery Battalion" for self-propelled units and the "Parachute (or Glider) Field Artillery Battalion" for airborne units. A number of "Field Artillery Groups" were also created during the war.

The Army Anti-Aircraft Command ARAACOM was created July 1950, and in 1957, ARAACOM was renamed to US Army Air Defense Command (USARADCOM).  A new system, the U.S. Army Combat Arms Regimental System, or CARS, was adopted in 1957 to replace the old regimental system. CARS used the Army's traditional regiments as parent organizations for historical purposes, but the primary building blocks are divisions, and brigades became battalions. Each battalion carries an association with a parent regiment, even though the regimental organization no longer exists. In some brigades several numbered battalions carrying the same regimental association may still serve together, and tend to consider themselves part of the traditional regiment when in fact they are independent battalions serving a brigade, rather than a regimental, headquarters. From circa 1959 through 1971 antiaircraft units and field artillery units were combined with common parent regiments for lineage purposes, for example the "1st Artillery".

In 1968 the Air Defense Artillery Branch (United States Army) was split from the artillery, with the Regular Army air defense and field artillery regiments separating on 1 September 1971.

The CARS was replaced by the U.S. Army Regimental System (USARS) in 1981.  US Artillery Structure 1989. On 1 October 2005, the word "regiment" was formally appended to the name of all active and inactive CARS and USARS regiments. So, for example, the 1st Cavalry officially became titled the 1st Cavalry Regiment.

During the Cold War the Field Artillery was responsible for all mobile ballistic missile weapons systems, including the Lance and Pershing II ballistic missiles.

Redlegs 
 Matt Bevin, 62nd Governor of Kentucky
 Tommy Franks, 7th Commander of United States Central Command (2000–2003)
 Berry Gordy, founder of Motown Record Corp.
 Alexander Hamilton, Founding Father of the United States and first Secretary of the Treasury.
 Edwin Meese, 75th United States Attorney General
 Raymond T. Odierno, 38th Chief of Staff of the United States Army
 Charles Rangel, Member of U.S. House of Representatives (1971–2017)
 Samuel Ringgold, Hero of the Battle of Palo Alto
James N. Robertson, Member of the Pennsylvania House of Representatives (1949–1952), Brigadier general in the Pennsylvania National Guard
 John Shalikashvili, Supreme Allied Commander Europe, 1992–1993, 13th Chairman of the Joint Chiefs of Staff
 Harry S. Truman, 33rd President of the United States
 Allen West, Retired U.S. Army Lieutenant Colonel and member of U.S. House of Representatives (2011–2013)
 William Westmoreland, 25th Chief of Staff of the United States Army and 2nd Commander of Military Assistance Command, Vietnam
 John William Vessey Jr, 10th Chairman of the Joint Chiefs of Staff
 Carl E. Vuono, 31st Chief of Staff of the United States Army
 Dennis J. Reimer, 33rd Chief of Staff of the United States Army
 Maxwell D. Taylor, 20th Chief of Staff of the United States Army, 5th Chairman of the Joint Chiefs of Staff, and Ambassador to South Vietnam
 Randolph Scott, film actor and 2nd Lieutenant of Artillery, 1917–1919
 George H. Thomas, Major General in the Civil War and famous as the "Rock of Chickamauga"
 J.H. Binford Peay III, 24th Vice Chief of Staff of the Army, 5th Commander of United States Central Command, and 14th Superintendent of the Virginia Military Institute
 Joe R. Reeder, Undersecretary of the Army, 1993–1997
 Jack N. Merritt, U.S. Military Representative to NATO, 1985–1987, National Security Council

See also
 Field artillery in the American Civil War
 List of artillery
 List of field artillery regiments of the United States
 List of United States War Department Forms – lists US Army ordnance publications circa 1895–1920, links online versions, including many field artillery weapons
 Siege artillery in the American Civil War
 United States Army branch insignia
 US Field artillery team
 U.S. Horse Artillery Brigade

Notes

References

Bibliography
 

 Hazlett, James C., Edwin Olmstead, and M. Hume Parks. Field Artillery Weapons of the American Civil War, rev. ed., Urbana: University of Illinois Press, 1983. .
 
 
 
 Ripley, Warren. Artillery and Ammunition of the Civil War. 4th ed. Charleston, SC: The Battery Press, 1984. .
 
 

 http://historicalresources.net/ResearchTools/M728.pdf (Page 8) 
 Official US Army lineage site for current field artillery units

External links
Ike Skelton Combined Arms Research Library
The Organizational History of Field Artillery from 1775 to 2003 

Morris Swett Digital Collections at the Field Artillery School at Fort Sill

Artillery of the United States
Field artillery
Branches of the United States Army
Military units and formations established in 1775
1775 establishments in the Thirteen Colonies
Artillery administrative corps